Ravenholm is a fictional ghost town in the first-person shooter video game Half-Life 2, developed by Valve Corporation and released in 2004. It is the main setting for the game's sixth chapter, "We Don't Go to Ravenholm", which follows the game's protagonist, Gordon Freeman, as he journeys through the area in a nighttime escape from Black Mesa East after it is attacked by the Combine, in order to reach the coast. An Eastern European mining town destroyed by a Combine bombardment of ravenous alien headcrabs that turned its residents into hostile zombies, its sole survivor, Father Grigori, offers his assistance to Freeman throughout the level, culminating in a last stand.

The level has received critical praise due to its level design and sudden horror overtones involving the headcrabs and zombies, with some critics calling it one of the most well-designed levels in a Valve game or one of the best first-person shooter levels ever made. Due to its popularity, Valve initially contracted Junction Point Studios to make a prequel episode featuring the town, a project that later became a spin-off game developed by Arkane Studios that further followed the story of Father Grigori and his fight against the Combine. However, it was ultimately cancelled partway through development.

Level content 
Before the player enters the level itself, Alyx Vance speaks the line "we don't go [to Ravenholm] anymore", foreshadowing its overrun nature. The player visits Ravenholm when Black Mesa East is attacked by the Combine, shortly after obtaining the Gravity Gun and using it to play catch with the robotic Dog. Dog opens the door to the area, allowing the player access to the town's outskirts and beginning the game's sixth chapter.

When the player first enters, the music shifts to a traditional horror score, and they see a pair of decapitated legs hanging from a tree, soon after discovering headcrabs and zombies have infested the town. The sudden shift in genre forces players to raise their guard, which is warranted due to the fact that the level is the hardest the player has faced up until that point. Enemies in the level include poisonous headcrabs that can easily drain the player's life, and Fast Zombies that are more agile than those seen in the original Half-Life.

After first defeating several zombies with traps or sawblades left in the area, the player meets Father Grigori atop a burning pile of zombies. The player follows Grigori, using traps such as a car mounted to a winch to defeat more zombies, as they move to the town's Central Thoroughfare, then to the Warehouse District, where they meet the new Fast Zombies. Grigori throws the player a shotgun in order to help them fight the enemies. In the next area, the Town Square, the player encounters and fights Poison Zombies. The player heads out of town through the Church Grounds, where they again meet Grigori who gives them ammunition, and finally, the Graveyard, where Grigori helps the player enter a crypt at the far end, holding off the zombies in a last stand. The player continues on through the Mines, escaping via the Railway Sidings to reach Shorepoint, a scrapyard held by the Resistance.

Plot 
Initially, Ravenholm was a small mining town, mainly containing decrepit wooden houses. Following the invasion of the Combine, a hostile alliance of alien races, it became one of the last bastions of the Resistance, a group of humans who opposed the alien occupation. When the Combine discovered the town's location, they bombarded it with Headcrab Shells, biological weapons containing numerous alien headcrabs that can take over their victims and turn them into zombies. These headcrab launchers were rarely used by the Combine, and their deployment may have been an act of retribution towards the Resistance. The total zombification of its population caused the rebels outside the town to begin only speaking of it in whispers, and warning others not to go near it.

Development 

The Ravenholm level was initially called "Traptown" or "phystown" in the game's files during an early E3 demo of the game, referring to the many booby traps scattered through it. Datamined information by fans showed that an early build featured Combine soldiers in addition to the zombies, and that it emphasized the mining town aspect more, including allowing the player to control a large digging machine. The original version of Ravenholm may have also been set chronologically before the player arrives at the lab of Eli Vance and acquires the Gravity Gun. The weapon ultimately ended up defining the level, encouraging the player to decapitate zombies using saw blades and other incidental objects as an alternative to shooting them. Players who possessed shared knowledge of zombie-based horror instilled by fiction such as The Zombie Survival Guide, could instinctively guess that the physics objects could be used as weapons.

Level designer Dario Casali stated that Ravenholm was conceived as a "sanctuary gone bad", where the player went expecting help from allies, but realized they had all become enemies. He also said that the town was created to seem isolated so that it could have believably escaped Combine notice for a while, but match the world of Half-Life 2 at the same time, describing this as a challenge. Designers first created the traps in the level using "simple geometric shapes", but then turned to concept artists to convert the ideas into something more detailed and realistic.

It is generally believed by fans and critics that Ravenholm was partially based on a section of the 1998 video game Thief: The Dark Project called the “Sealed Section", as Marc Laidlaw was a fan of the game. A quarter of a great city that had become infested by undead, it stood in contrast with the technological advancement surrounding it, and many who knew about it refused to go near it. However, unlike the Thief level, the player has not yet encountered overt horror elements in Half-Life 2 before arriving at Ravenholm.

Cancelled projects 
Between 2005 and mid-2007, an episode developed by Junction Point Studios, with a team led by Warren Spector, was initially planned to explain the backstory behind both Ravenholm and Grigori, showing how the town was destroyed and Grigori became the character seen in Half-Life 2. The game would have included a Magnet Gun that could attract metal objects from a remote location with metal ball projectiles. This project was eventually cancelled and the studio went on to develop Epic Mickey instead.

The concept was later given to Arkane Studios and changed into a spin-off game entitled Return to Ravenholm (or simply Ravenholm) solely set in the fictional town, but was cancelled by Valve after "9 or 10" levels had already been completed. Intended as a linear game, it would star Adrian Shepard, protagonist of Half-Life: Opposing Force, as he fought the aliens with the help of Father Grigori. Grigori, who was revealed to have survived his last stand in the original game, would have gradually mutated into an inhuman being as the result of a serum created from headcrab blood that he believed would protect him from the aliens. The game would also have introduced several new weapons, such as the nail gun (that could power up doors by acting as electrical conductors), a plasma weapon, and a weaponized leaf blower that could be used to double jump. Laidlaw stated that reasons behind the cancellation included the fact that headcrabs and zombies "were pretty much played out at the time", and that the fact that it had to take place prior to Episode Two was too creatively constraining. Footage of the project was later revealed in a 2020 documentary by Noclip, The Untold History of Arkane.

Reception 
The level's originality caused it to stand out to critics. Alex Avard of GamesRadar+ called Ravenholm an example of a horror sequence in a non-horror game, describing it as "harrowing" and a "blood-soaked frightfest". Ashley Reed of the same publication praised the game's inclusion of "Zombie Chopper", an achievement forcing the player to beat the entire level with only the Gravity Gun, saying that the absence of weapons forced her to think creatively about how to survive, using items such as saw blades as impromptu weapons, and strategies such as fleeing the zombies before they could notice.

The level was praised for its effective use of horror elements. Matthew Byrd of Den of Geek described Ravenholm as "the perfect horror level", saying that it both attempted to celebrate the tropes of the horror genre and effectively utilize them to scare the player. Suggesting that it "just happened to be the perfect idea released at the perfect time", he said that some elements of the level "certainly don't feel quite as groundbreaking" 15 years later as they did upon the game's release. Andy Kelly of PC Gamer included the game on the list of his best FPS levels ever, calling it "a tense, terrifying gauntlet" and "probably the best level Valve has ever designed". Padraig Cotter of Screen Rant stated that the level was "arguably the game's most famous" and had a "perfect balance" of horror and action. Calling the town's atmosphere "oppressive", he noted that the level's incidental details, such as bodies and gore, told a "powerful story", saying that it was "hard not to feel sorry" for the unwillingly transformed zombies. Jenna Stoeber of Polygon called Ravenholm an example of Valve's best level design techniques, praising its strong core narrative idea, and the fact that the player comes across the level in medias res. Jeremy Parish of USgamer stated that Ravenholm "makes great use of audio cues to build tension", noting how the player can hear poison headcrabs before they see them.

See also 

 Locations of Half-Life
 Half-Life 2: Lost Coast
 Unreleased Half-Life games

References

Further reading

Half-Life (series)
Bioterrorism in fiction
Cancelled Windows games
Fictional elements introduced in 2004
Fictional locations in Europe
Fictional populated places
Ghost towns in fiction
Video game levels
Video game locations

fr:Ravenholm
pl:Ravenholm
ru:Рейвенхолм
fi:Ravenholm
sv:Half-Life 2#Platser